Observability is a measure of how well internal states of a system can be inferred from knowledge of its external outputs.

In control theory, the observability and controllability of a linear system are mathematical duals.

The concept of observability was introduced by the Hungarian-American engineer Rudolf E. Kálmán for linear dynamic systems. A dynamical system designed to estimate the state of a system from measurements of the outputs is called a state observer or simply an observer for that system.

Definition
Consider a physical system modeled in state-space representation. A system is said to be observable if, for every possible evolution of state and control vectors, the current state can be estimated using only the information from outputs (physically, this generally corresponds to information obtained by sensors). In other words, one can determine the behavior of the entire system from the system's outputs. On the other hand, if the system is not observable, there are state trajectories that are not distinguishable by only measuring the outputs.

Linear time-invariant systems 
For time-invariant linear systems in the state space representation, there are convenient tests to check whether a system is observable. Consider a SISO system with  state variables (see state space for details about MIMO systems) given by

Observability matrix 
If and only if the column rank of the observability matrix, defined as

The rationale for this test is that if  columns are linearly independent, then each of the  state variables is viewable through linear combinations of the output variables .

Related concepts

Observability index 
The observability index  of a linear time-invariant discrete system is the smallest natural number for which the following is satisfied: , where

Unobservable subspace 

Since the system is observable if and only if  ,  the system is observable if and only if  is the zero subspace.

The following properties for the unobservable subspace are valid:

Detectability 
A slightly weaker notion than observability is detectability. A system is detectable if all the unobservable states are stable.

Detectability conditions are important in the context of sensor networks.

Linear time-varying systems 

Consider the continuous linear time-variant system

 
 

 
where  is the state-transition matrix.

It is possible to determine a unique  if  is nonsingular.

Note that the matrix  defined as above has the following properties:
  is symmetric
  is positive semidefinite for 
  satisfies the linear matrix differential equation
 
  satisfies the equation

Observability matrix generalization 
The system is observable in  if and only if there exists an interval  in  such that the matrix  is nonsingular.

If  are analytic, then the system is observable in the interval [,] if there exists  and a positive integer k such that

 

Example 

Nonlinear systems 
Given the system , . Where  the state vector,  the input vector and  the output vector.   are to be smooth vector fields.

Define the observation space  to be the space containing all repeated Lie derivatives, then the system is observable in  if and only if , where

Early criteria for observability in nonlinear dynamic systems were discovered by Griffith and Kumar, Kou, Elliot and Tarn, and Singh.

There also exist an observability criteria for nonlinear time-varying systems.

Static systems and general topological spaces 

In the nonlinear case,  observability can be characterized for individual variables, and also for local estimator behavior rather than just global behavior.

See also 
 Controllability
 Identifiability
 State observer
 State space (controls)

References

External links

 MATLAB function for checking observability of a system
 Mathematica function for checking observability of a system

Classical control theory

fr:Représentation d'état#Observabilité et détectabilité